Edanadu  is a village situated  from Chengannur in Alappuzha district, Kerala, India. It lies on the banks of the Pampa River. Edanadu is situated in the extreme eastern part of Alappuzha district and forms the geographical border between Alappuzha and Pathanamthitta district.

Eda Nadu ( Vilavancode and Kalkulam taluks) which rise the present Kanyakumari district, Tamil Nadu, India
were ruled by the Venad Kingdom, Travancore Kingdom.

References

Villages in Alappuzha district